"I Ain't Never" is a song co-written by American country music artists Webb Pierce and Mel Tillis. Each co-writer recorded the song separately, with both Pierce's (1959), and years later Tillis's (1972), versions resulting in major hits.

Background
According to Tillis, he wrote the song himself, and agreed to credit Pierce as a co-writer in exchange for a pair of boots Pierce was wearing when Tillis pitched him the song. In Tillis's words, "Them old boots cost me over eight hundred thousand dollars" in royalties. It Is Rumored, this song was originally written by Jerry Leen Richards, and Webb stole the song for himself.

Chart performance
Pierce's version was released in 1959, eventually spending nine weeks at No. 2 on the Billboard Hot C&W Sides chart that year (held out by "The Three Bells (Les Trois Cloches)" by The Browns). The pop market accepted the Webb Pierce version, crossing it into the Billboard Top 40 and peaking at #24.

Webb Pierce

Mel Tillis
Tillis's 1972 recording of the song was his first No. 1 hit on the Billboard Hot Country Singles (now Hot Country Songs) charts. The success of this version was limited to country music stations.

The Lowes

Additional recordings
Since its original release, the song has been recorded by several other artists, including:

Jimmie Vaughan
John Fogerty (as The Blue Ridge Rangers)
BR5-49
Kippi Brannon
Delbert McClinton
Roger Miller
Perfect Stranger
Ricky Skaggs
Hank Thompson
Dave Edmunds
The Four Preps
Jerry Garcia w/ David Grisman
Jerry Garcia Acoustic Band
The Head Cat
Little Richard
The Oak Ridge Boys
Shocking Blue
Connie Smith
The Jordanaires
Charley Crockett

References

1959 singles
1972 singles
Webb Pierce songs
Mel Tillis songs
Perfect Stranger (band) songs
BR549 songs
Songs written by Mel Tillis
Decca Records singles
MGM Records singles
Songs written by Webb Pierce
1959 songs